HMS Gould (K476) was a British Captain-class frigate of the Royal Navy in commission during World War II. Originally constructed as the United States Navy Evarts-class destroyer escort USS Lovering (DE-272), she served in the Royal Navy from 1943 until her sinking in 1944.

Construction and transfer
The ship was ordered on 25 January 1942 and laid down as the destroyer escort USS Lovering (DE-272), the first ship of the name, by the Boston Navy Yard in Boston, Massachusetts, on 20 May 1943. She was launched on 8 July 1943, sponsored by Mrs. Joseph S. Lovering, sister-in-law of the ships namesake, the late Ensign William B. Lovering. The United States transferred the ship upon completion to the United Kingdom under Lend-Lease on 18 September 1943.

Service history

The ship was commissioned into service in the Royal Navy as the frigate HMS Gould (K476) on 18 September 1943 simultaneously with her transfer. She served on convoy escort duty in the North Atlantic Ocean.

Gore and Garlies were forced to withdraw to Gibraltar to refuel on 1 March, but Affleck and Gould continued to attack U-358. During the afternoon of 1 March, U-358 succeeded in torpedoing and sinking Gould with a G7es – known to the Allies as "GNAT" – torpedo at  position . Ungoed, six other officers, and 116 ratings died in the sinking, and only 14 of Goulds crew survived. U-358 was soon forced to surface after 38 hours submerged and was sunk by gunfire from Affleck at position .

References

External links

Navsource Online: Destroyer Escort Photo Archive Lovering (DE-272) - HMS Gould (K-476)

Captain Class Frigate Association HMS Gould K476 (DE 272)

Captain-class frigates
Evarts-class destroyer escorts
World War II frigates of the United Kingdom
World War II frigates and destroyer escorts of the United States
Ships built in Boston
1943 ships
Ships sunk by German submarines in World War II
World War II shipwrecks in the Atlantic Ocean
Maritime incidents in March 1944